Acusta tourannensis is a species of air-breathing land snail, a terrestrial pulmonate gastropod mollusc in the family Camaenidae.

Distribution
The distribution of this species includes:
 Pratas Island, Taiwan
 Japan

This species has not yet become established in the US, but it is considered to represent a potentially serious threat as a pest, an invasive species which could negatively affect agriculture, natural ecosystems, human health or commerce. Therefore, it has been suggested that this species be given top national quarantine significance in the USA.

References

External links

Camaenidae
Gastropods described in 1842